Aljoša Kunac (born 18 August 1980 in Split) is a Croatian water polo player who competed in the 2008 Summer Olympics.

See also
 List of world champions in men's water polo
 List of World Aquatics Championships medalists in water polo

References

External links
 

1980 births
Living people
Croatian male water polo players
Olympic water polo players of Croatia
Water polo players at the 2008 Summer Olympics
Water polo players from Split, Croatia
World Aquatics Championships medalists in water polo